Captain Gary L. Herod (December 10, 1929 – March 15, 1961) was a Texas Air National Guard pilot who was killed when his T-33 jet trainer crashed on the afternoon of March 15, 1961.

Shortly after takeoff from Ellington Field southeast of Houston, Texas, Herod experienced engine failure.  Although it is likely that he could have ejected safely, he remained with the plane to ensure that it did not crash into the suburban homes of Houston TX neighborhoods. Herod initially turned his plane around in an effort to return to Ellington Field or another airport. He radioed air traffic control that he was going to bail out.  When controllers asked for confirmation he replied “not yet”.  These were his last words.  Herod stayed with his plane until it crashed into what was then a vacant field surrounded by homes.  The crash site was opposite the end of Atwell Drive on the north bank of Braes Bayou.

Capt. Herod was a member of the 182nd Fighter Squadron, of the 149th Fighter Wing, of the Texas Air National Guard, based at Kelly Air Force Base, in San Antonio, Texas.

Honors and Memorials

The Air Force awarded Herod a posthumous Distinguished Flying Cross.
The original "Hero Tree" was dedicated in Herod's honor on Memorial Day 1961.  The tree, stone marker, and plaque were located near the Meyerland Plaza shopping center a few miles east of the crash site.  The tree was cut down on July 17, 2018.  The stone marker and plaque were relocated to the grounds of Herod Elementary School.
The Gary L. Herod Elementary School is located near the crash site and is named in Herod's honor.  His photo and memorial flag are on display in the school library.  Outside the school entrance is a plaque that tells the story of his heroism.

References

External links
 Home page of Gary L. Herod Elementary School

United States Air Force officers
1961 deaths
Recipients of the Distinguished Flying Cross (United States)
1929 births